The Golden State Warriors are an American professional basketball team based in San Francisco. The Warriors compete in the National Basketball Association (NBA), as a member of the league's Western Conference Pacific Division. Founded in 1946 in Philadelphia, the Warriors moved to the San Francisco Bay Area in 1962 and took the city's name, before changing its geographic moniker to Golden State in 1971. The club plays its home games at the Chase Center.

The Warriors won the inaugural Basketball Association of America (BAA) championship in 1947, and won again in 1956, led by Hall of Fame trio Paul Arizin, Tom Gola, and Neil Johnston. After the trade of star Wilt Chamberlain in January 1965, the team finished the 1964–65 season with the NBA's worst record (17–63). Their rebuilding period was brief due in large part to the Warriors' drafting of Rick Barry four months after the trade. In 1975, star players Barry and Jamaal Wilkes powered the Warriors to their third championship, widely considered one of the biggest upsets in NBA history.

The team struggled in the 1980s, then became playoff regulars at the turn of the decade with stars Tim Hardaway, Mitch Richmond, and Chris Mullin, nicknamed "Run TMC". Led by Stephen Curry, Klay Thompson, and Draymond Green, the team returned to championship glory in 2015, with defensive swingman Andre Iguodala being named Finals MVP. In 2016, the Warriors set the record for best regular season record at 73-9 before losing the Finals to the Cleveland Cavaliers (against whom they played a record four straight finals against) and becoming the first team to lose a series after leading 3–1 in the Finals. After signing former MVP Kevin Durant, the team won back-to-back championships in 2017 and 2018 (Durant winning both Finals MVPs). They lost the 2019 Finals to the Toronto Raptors, a series which saw Durant and Thompson suffer serious Achilles and ACL injuries, respectively; Durant left that off-season. After missing the playoffs the previous two seasons, the Warriors returned to the playoffs with a healthy Thompson and a new supporting cast that included All-Star Andrew Wiggins and key scorer Jordan Poole; they defeated the Boston Celtics in the 2022 Finals, where Curry won his first Finals MVP. The Warriors' dynasty has seen the team win 4 titles in 8 seasons, as well as reach five consecutive Finals from 2015 to 2019 (6 Finals in 8 years); Curry, Green, Thompson, and Iguodala were on all four 21st century championship teams, Shaun Livingston and Kevon Looney were on three each.

Nicknamed the "Dubs" as a shortening of "W's", the Warriors hold several NBA records: best regular season, most wins in a season (regular season and postseason combined), and best postseason run. Curry and Thompson are generally considered among the greatest backcourts of all time. The Warriors have the third most NBA championships and have the third most Finals appearances; only the Los Angeles Lakers and Boston Celtics have more. Wilt Chamberlain and Stephen Curry have been named the NBA's MVPs while playing for the Warriors, for a total of three MVP awards.

Franchise history

1946–1962: Early years in Philadelphia

The Warriors were founded in 1946 as the Philadelphia Warriors, a charter member of the Basketball Association of America. They were owned by Peter A. Tyrrell, who also owned the Philadelphia Rockets of the American Hockey League. Tyrrell hired Eddie Gottlieb, a longtime basketball promoter in the Philadelphia area, as coach and general manager. The owners named the team after the Philadelphia Warriors, an old basketball team who played in the American Basketball League in 1925.

Led by early scoring sensation Joe Fulks, the team won the championship in the league's inaugural 1946–47 season by defeating the Chicago Stags, four games to one. The NBA, which was created by a 1949 merger, officially recognizes that as its own first championship. Gottlieb bought the team in 1951.

The Warriors won its next championship in Philadelphia in the 1955–56 season, defeating the Fort Wayne Pistons four games to one. The Warrior stars of this era were future Hall of Famers Paul Arizin, Tom Gola and Neil Johnston.

1959–1965: The Wilt Chamberlain era

In 1959, the team signed draft pick Wilt Chamberlain. Known as "Wilt the Stilt", he led the team in scoring six times, quickly began shattering NBA scoring records and changed the NBA style of play forever. On March 2, 1962, in a Warrior "home" game played on a neutral court in Hershey, Pennsylvania, Chamberlain scored 100 points against the New York Knicks, a single-game record the NBA ranks among its finest moments.

In 1962, Franklin Mieuli purchased the majority shares of the team and relocated the franchise to the San Francisco Bay Area, renaming them the San Francisco Warriors. The Warriors played most of their home games at the Cow Palace in Daly City (the facility lies just south of the San Francisco city limits) from 1962 to 1964 and the San Francisco Civic Auditorium from 1964 to 1966, though occasionally playing home games in nearby cities such as Oakland and San Jose. They also played frequently at The University of San Francisco gymnasium.

Prior to the 1963–64 NBA season, the Warriors drafted big man Nate Thurmond to go along with Chamberlain. The Warriors won the Western Division crown that season, but lost the 1964 NBA Finals to the Boston Celtics, four games to one. In the 1964–65 season, the Warriors traded Chamberlain to the Philadelphia 76ers for Connie Dierking, Lee Shaffer, Paul Neumann and $150,000 and won only 17 games.

1965–1978: Thurmond and Barry

In 1965, they drafted Rick Barry in the first round who went on to become NBA Rookie of the Year that season and then led the Warriors to the NBA Finals in the 1966–67 season, losing (four games to two) to Chamberlain's new team that had replaced the Warriors in Philadelphia, the 76ers.

Angered by management's failure to pay him certain incentive bonuses he felt were due him, Barry sat out the 1967–68 season and signed with the Oakland Oaks of the rival American Basketball Association for the following year, but after four seasons in the ABA rejoined the Warriors in 1972. During Barry's absence, the Warriors were no longer title contenders, and the mantle of leadership fell to Thurmond, Jeff Mullins and Rudy LaRusso. They began scheduling more home games in Oakland with the opening of the Oakland Coliseum Arena in 1966 and the 1970–71 season was the team's last as the San Francisco Warriors.

The franchise adopted its brand name Golden State Warriors prior to the 1971–72 season, to suggest that the team represented the entire state of California. Almost all home games were played in Oakland that season; six were played in San Diego, but none in San Francisco or Daly City. Oakland Arena became the team's exclusive home court in 1971.

The Warriors made the playoffs from 1971 to 1977 except in 1974, and won their first NBA championship on the West Coast in 1974–75. In what many consider the biggest upset in NBA history, Golden State not only defeated the heavily favored Washington Bullets but humiliated them in a four-game sweep. That team was coached by former Warrior Al Attles, and led on the court by Rick Barry and Jamaal Wilkes. Barry was named Finals MVP.

At 59–23, the Warriors had the league's best record during the 1975–76 season. They were upset, however, by the 42–40 Phoenix Suns in seven games in the Western Conference Finals.

1978–1985: A period of struggles
Due of the loss of key players such as Barry, Wilkes and Thurmond to trades and retirements, the Warriors struggled to put a competitive team on the court from 1978 to 1987 after being one of the NBA's dominant teams in the 1960s and most of the 1970s. Through the NBA draft, however, they acquired some players such as high-scoring forward Purvis Short (1978), former Purdue center Joe Barry Carroll (1980) and center Robert Parish (1976), who was traded to the Boston Celtics in 1980 along with the draft pick that would become Kevin McHale for the pick used to draft Carroll. In 1983, the Warriors matched the New York Knicks' offer for free-agent Bernard King, but, unable to pay his high salary, quickly traded him to the Knicks for guard Micheal Ray Richardson, whom they soon shipped to New Jersey in exchange for former Georgetown Hoya point guard Eric "Sleepy" Floyd, and journeyman forward Mickey Johnson. Floyd once scored 29 points for the Warriors in the fourth quarter of a playoff game against the Lakers, though he was later traded to the Houston Rockets.

The departure of these players for various reasons symbolized the franchise's futility during this period, as head coach Attles moved up to the front office as general manager in 1980 and the team made several coaching changes. New owners Jim Fitzgerald and Dan Finane finally managed to return the team to respectability by hiring former Cleveland Cavaliers head coach George Karl as head coach in 1986 after selecting St. John's small forward Chris Mullin in the 1985 NBA draft.

1985–1997: The Chris Mullin and "Run TMC" era
After a subpar stretch in the late 1970s and early 1980s, the team had a brief resurgence under coach Karl, culminating in a 1987 Western Conference Semifinal match against Magic Johnson and the Los Angeles Lakers that is still shown on TV in the NBA's Greatest Games series. The second-half performance by the Warriors' All-Star point guard Sleepy Floyd still stands as the NBA playoff record for points scored in a quarter (29) and in a half (39). His six consecutive field goals in the fourth quarter led to a 51-point finish for him and a victory for the Warriors.

The "Sleepy Floyd game" catalyzed increased interest in the NBA in the Bay Area; so did new coach Don Nelson, who engineered a string of wins in the late 1980s and early 1990s with the high-scoring trio of point guard Tim Hardaway, guard Mitch Richmond and forward Chris Mullin. Collectively known as "Run TMC" after the rap group Run-D.M.C., the trio stayed together for just two seasons and won only one playoff series. Nelson sent Richmond to the Sacramento Kings for rookie power forward Billy Owens, a promising young front-court player meant to complement the coach's run-and-gun system. Nelson had been brought to the Warriors from the Milwaukee Bucks by Jim Fitzgerald, who co-owned the team from 1986 to 1995 with Dan Finnane. In 1993–94, with first-round draft pick and Rookie of the Year power forward Chris Webber playing with off-guard Latrell Sprewell, the Warriors made the playoffs.

At the start of the next season, however, a rift formed between Webber and Sprewell on the one hand and Nelson on the other. All three soon left the team, and the organization went into a tailspin. The 1994–95 season was the first under new team owner Chris Cohan, who had bought out Fitzgerald and Finnane. The Warriors selected power forward prospect Joe Smith as their first overall draft pick in 1995 and hired Rick Adelman as the new head coach. They sent Tim Hardaway and Chris Gatling to the Miami Heat for Kevin Willis and Bimbo Coles midway through the 1995–96 season, and ended up with a 36–46 record, three wins short of making the playoffs. While their home court, the Oakland Coliseum Arena, was being extensively renovated, the 1996–97 Warriors played their home games in the San Jose Arena and struggled to a 30–52 finish. Following the season, Mullin was traded to the Indiana Pacers in exchange for Erick Dampier and Duane Ferrell.

1997–2009: Wilderness years and "We Believe" Warriors
Longtime Seton Hall college coach P. J. Carlesimo, who had been recently fired by the Portland Trail Blazers, replaced Adelman as head coach for the 1997–98 season. Sprewell was suspended for the remainder of the season for losing his temper and choking Carlesimo during a team practice in December, generating the glaring newspaper headline "WARRIORS HIT ROCK BOTTOM" and the declaration by general manager Garry St. Jean that Sprewell would never play for the Warriors again. He would not play in the NBA again until he was dealt in January 1999 to the New York Knicks for John Starks, Chris Mills and Terry Cummings.

St. Jean had become the new Warriors' general manager in July 1997; he and his predecessor Dave Twardzik received much of the blame for the Warriors' struggles early in Cohan's turbulent tenure as owner in addition to Cohan himself. St. Jean brought in players such as Terry Cummings, John Starks and Mookie Blaylock who were well past their primes. Twardzik drafted several flops, such as Todd Fuller (while Kobe Bryant was still available as well as Steve Nash and Jermaine O'Neal) and Steve Logan (who never played an NBA game). In the following draft, the team selected Adonal Foyle while Tracy McGrady was still available. St. Jean did, however, draft future two-time NBA slam dunk champion off-guard Jason Richardson (from Michigan State), a Warriors' star scorer through the 2006–07 season.

For a few years, with rising stars Richardson, small forward Antawn Jamison and point guard Gilbert Arenas leading the team, the Warriors seemed like a team on the rise; but the young Warriors did not have enough in the competitive Western Conference to make the playoffs. After the 2002–03 season, St. Jean's earlier mistakes of committing money to players like Danny Fortson, Adonal Foyle and Erick Dampier were painfully felt by Warriors' fans when the team was unable to re-sign Arenas despite his desire to stay in the Bay Area. A new rule was implemented in response to second-round draft picks who quickly become superstars.

In June 2003, Cohan elevated marketing executive Robert Rowell to Team President, a role which involved hiring, firing and contract negotiation on the basketball side. After a disappointing 2003-04 season, head coach Eric Musselman and St. Jean were fired. Mike Montgomery was hired as head coach and Chris Mullin was chosen to succeed St. Jean with the title of Executive Vice President of Basketball Operations. Mullin hoped to build a winning team around Jason Richardson, Mike Dunleavy Jr and Troy Murphy, and drafted 7-foot center Andris Biedriņš from Latvia (11th overall). At the 2005 trading deadline, he bolstered to the team with the acquisition of point guard Baron Davis, bringing to the team its first superstar since Mullin himself. 

The Warriors enjoyed a great start to the 2005–06 season, entering the new year with a plus .500 winning percentage for the first time since 1994, but managed to win only 13 more games through the end of March due to injuries. Davis often found himself at odds with new head coach Mike Montgomery (used to dealing with college players in his long tenure at Stanford) and failed to remain healthy, playing in just 54 games. On April 5, 2006, the Warriors were officially eliminated from playoff contention in a 114–109 overtime loss to the Hornets, extending their playoff drought to 12 seasons.

Entering the 2006–07 season, the Warriors held the active record (12) for the most consecutive seasons without a playoff appearance (see Active NBA non-playoff appearance streaks). During the 2006 off-season, Golden State announced that it had bought out the remaining two years of coach Montgomery's contract and hired previous Golden State and former Dallas Mavericks coach Don Nelson to take over for him. During training camp, small forward Matt Barnes established himself in the rotation. On January 17, 2007, the Warriors traded the disappointing Murphy and Dunleavy with promising young power forward Ike Diogu and Keith McLeod to the Indiana Pacers for forward Al Harrington, forward/guard Stephen Jackson, guard Šarūnas Jasikevičius and forward Josh Powell. This trade allowed the Warriors to "run and gun" their way to the playoffs with a more athletic and talented team. On March 4, 2007, the Warriors suffered a 106–107 loss in Washington, the Wizards handing them their 6th straight loss when former Warrior Arenas hit a technical free throw with less than one second remaining after Nelson had protested a controversial call with the Warriors ahead by a slim margin. The loss dropped them to 26–35.

March 4 marked the turning point for the Warriors. The Warriors closed out the regular season (42–40) at 16–5 in their last 21 games. "We Believe" became the Warriors' slogan for the last two months of the season and the playoffs.

Led by a healthy Baron Davis, an ever-improving Jason Richardson and young future star off-guard Monta Ellis as well as center Biedriņš, the Warriors immediately dashed the highly favored top-seed Dallas Mavericks' expectations of a short and easy series win with a Game 1 victory in Dallas thanks to Davis' frantic style of play. The Mavericks came back to win Game 2 easily to tie the series at a game apiece, but the Warriors won both Games 3 and 4 with a huge lift from the home crowd at Oracle Arena. A close Game 5 saw the Mavericks eke out a 118–112 victory with a last-minute surge led by superstar forward Dirk Nowitzki to send the series back to California at 3–2. In Game 6, the Warriors engineered a third-quarter 18–0 run to eliminate the Mavericks and become the NBA's first No. 8 seed to beat a No. 1 seed in a seven-game series (and the first NBA No. 8 seed to beat the top seed since 1999 when the New York Knicks eliminated the Miami Heat). It was an upset in name only, given the fact that the Warriors had swept the Mavericks in the regular-season series.

The Warriors went on to play the Utah Jazz in the second round of the 2006–07 playoffs, where they dropped two close games at EnergySolutions Arena to open the series. The series then shifted to the Oracle Arena, where the Warriors won Game 3 in a convincing blowout. Davis scored 32 points and electrified the crowd with a monster dunk on Jazz forward Andrei Kirilenko late in the fourth quarter, but they lost Game 4 at home, their first loss in Oakland in well over a month and the Jazz closed them out in Game 5 in Salt Lake City.

In the 2007–08 season, the Warriors faced early difficulties in their attempt to return to the playoffs. Richardson was traded to the Charlotte Bobcats for rookie Brandan Wright. To make things even worse, Jackson was suspended for seven games over a firearm incident. They opened the season with six straight losses, but Ellis' rise, Davis' solid injury-free season (21.6 points, 8 assists, 4.6 rebounds per game), and an overall improvement in team chemistry brought them back to playoff contention; but in the end the Warriors failed to make the playoffs despite a 48–34 record, which is the best record in NBA history for a non-playoff team since the NBA playoffs had expanded to eight teams per conference. The Western Conference was very strong that season; every playoff team won 50 games, leaving the Warriors two games out of the last playoff spot. The Warriors sold out nearly every home game during the season averaging 19,631 per game, the highest in team history.

In the 2008 off-season, Baron Davis opted to return to his home town and sign with the Los Angeles Clippers. With the 14th pick of that year's draft, the Warriors selected and signed Anthony Randolph out of LSU. To compensate for the loss of Davis, the Warriors signed free agents Corey Maggette and Ronny Turiaf and re-signed Ellis and Andris Biedriņš to long-term contracts.

The Warriors had a disappointing 2008–09 season, finishing 29–53. Ellis was injured in a moped accident, and suspended for 30 games for riding the vehicle against the terms of his contract, depriving the Warriors of their top player. They traded disenchanted forward Al Harrington to the New York Knicks for guard Jamal Crawford, and were undone by injuries and the minimal experience of their young players such as Anthony Morrow and Brandan Wright. Coach Nelson often had to make adjustments to the starting lineups since many of the original starters missed games due to injuries. Despite the team's losing record, the Warriors were hard to beat when they had a healthy lineup and a strong bench. With leadership and improvement in their young players, they were sometimes able to defeat powerhouse teams such as the Boston Celtics, 99–89.

2009–present: The Stephen Curry era

2009–2012: Continued struggles and good draft choices
The Warriors chose future superstar point guard Stephen Curry of Davidson College with the seventh overall pick in the 2009 NBA draft. During the 2009 off-season, Warrior ownership declined to renew the contract of general manager Chris Mullin. Larry Riley, Nelson's longtime assistant coach, was promoted in his place; Riley drafted Curry and traded Jamal Crawford to the Atlanta Hawks for Acie Law and Speedy Claxton.

The Warriors had another injury-prone year in 2009–10 as they were consistently unable to field their ideal starting lineup. In November, a malcontented Stephen Jackson and seldom-used Acie Law were traded to the Charlotte Bobcats for Raja Bell (out for the season with an injury) and Vladimir Radmanovic. Four days later, they signed center Chris Hunter. Starting in January 2010, they issued multiple 10-day contracts, most notably to power forward Anthony Tolliver from the Idaho Stampede. Due to their multiple injuries, they were granted an exception allowing them to sign Reggie Williams from the Sioux Falls Skyforce to a 10-day contract on March 2. They eventually waived the injured Bell to sign Williams for the rest of the year and finished the season 26–56, failing to make the playoffs. Curry finished second in the NBA Rookie of the Year voting to the Sacramento Kings' Tyreke Evans and was named to the NBA All-Rookie First Team.

The Warriors selected Ekpe Udoh, a power forward from Baylor, as the 6th pick of the 2010 NBA draft. They also introduced a modernized version of their "The City" logo depicting the new eastern span of the San Francisco-Oakland Bay Bridge, and switched to a simplified color scheme of royal blue and gold. They also introduced new uniforms reminiscent of the 1969–71 "The City" uniforms. The Warriors made an off-season trade that sent Turiaf, Randolph and Kelenna Azubuike to the New York Knicks in return for star high-scoring power forward David Lee via a sign-and-trade. Lee agreed to a six-year, $80 million deal, on a framework contingent on the decision of superstar forward LeBron James to leave the Cleveland Cavaliers to sign with the Miami Heat that same day. Following Morrow's departure after he signed the New Jersey Nets' offer sheet, the Warriors signed Dorell Wright, formerly with the Miami Heat, to a three-year, $11 million deal.

On July 15, 2010, owner Chris Cohan sold the Warriors to Peter Guber of Mandalay Entertainment and his partner Joe Lacob for a then-record $450 million. On November 15, the Warriors announced the new 19-person ownership group composed of Joe Lacob, Peter Guber, Vivek Ranadivé, Erika Glazer, Fred Harman, Bob Piccinini, Larry Bowman, Danny German, Marty Glick, Chad Hurley, Craig R. Johnson, Bruce Karsh, Jeffrey A. Miller, Paul Schaeffer, David Scially, Nick Swinmurn, Harry Tsao, John Walecka, Dennis Wong and Chamath Palihapitiya.

The Warriors continued their 2010 off-season signing spree by adding Harvard guard Jeremy Lin to their roster with a one-year partially guaranteed contract containing a second-year team option; Lin became the first Taiwanese-American player in NBA history. Louis Amundson was then added for little under $5 million in mid-September. After coach Don Nelson resigned in September 2010, assistant coach Keith Smart was hired as the team's new head coach.

The Warriors won 36 games and failed to make the playoffs in 2010–11. The team broke a franchise record with 21 made three-pointers in a win against the Orlando Magic. In February 2011, the Warriors traded Brandan Wright and Dan Gadzuric for Troy Murphy and a 2012 second-round pick that was used on Draymond Green. On February 27, Murphy and the Warriors reached a buyout agreement and he was waived. In April 2011, Dorell Wright made a franchise record of 184 three-pointers in a season in a home win versus Los Angeles Lakers, surpassing Richardson's 183 in 2005–06. In a win against the Portland Trail Blazers, Wright then broke another NBA record, becoming the first player to have scored more points in his seventh season than in all his first six seasons combined. Wright ended the season with the most three-pointers made in the NBA that season with 194, as well as the most three-pointers attempted with 516; each mark set a new Warriors franchise record. Following the season, Curry received the NBA Sportsmanship Award. Coach Smart was dismissed on April 27, 2011, due to the change in ownership. Team President Rowell was also terminated and replaced with Rick Welts. Seventeen-year NBA veteran and former ABC and ESPN commentator Mark Jackson replaced Smart as head coach on June 6.

The Warriors selected future All-Star shooting guard Klay Thompson with the 11th pick in the 2011 NBA Draft. However, the team did not improve in the 2011–12 NBA season under coach Jackson, finishing the lockout-shortened season with a 23–43 record (13th in the conference) and again failing to make the playoffs. Due to the 2011 NBA lockout, Jackson could not establish his system in training camp. Hindered by several injuries to key players, the team then entered into another chaotic rebuilding phase. Team leader Monta Ellis was traded in mid-March 2012, along with Kwame Brown and Ekpe Udoh, to the Milwaukee Bucks for center Andrew Bogut (out injured for the season) and former Warrior small forward Stephen Jackson, who without playing a game for the Warriors was quickly traded to the San Antonio Spurs for Richard Jefferson and a conditional first-round pick on March 15. These moves saw the rise of Stephen Curry and David Lee to team co-captains, and saw Thompson move into a starting role. However, Curry suffered a series of ankle and foot-related injuries that limited him to 26 regular-season games.

2012–2014: Moving toward success
The Warriors' 2012 off-season moves changed the course of the franchise. In the 2012 draft, the Warriors selected small forward Harrison Barnes with the 7th overall pick, center Festus Ezeli with the 30th pick, small forward Draymond Green with the 35th pick, and 7-foot-1 center Ognjen Kuzmic with the 52nd pick. According to sportswriter Anthony Slater, in this draft, "Golden State got a starter [Barnes], a rotation player [Ezeli] and a transcendent talent that perfectly fit the small-ball direction of the league [Green]." In addition, Curry agreed to a four-year, $44 million rookie scale contract extension. At the time, many basketball writers considered the move risky for Golden State because of Curry's injury history. In 2016, however, Slater argued that Curry's relatively inexpensive contract paid "huge dividends" by freeing up the necessary funds to allow the team to "keep a strong core around him". The team made a series of other moves, trading Dorell Wright, obtaining point guard Jarrett Jack, and signing forward Carl Landry.

Despite early-season injuries to Brandon Rush and Andrew Bogut, and despite starting two rookies (Barnes and Ezeli), the 2012–13 Warriors had one of their best starts in decades. The team earned 20 wins in less than 30 games played for the first time since 1992. The Warriors also achieved a milestone by completing their first ever 6–1 road trip in franchise history, including a 97–95 win over the defending champion Heat in Miami. On April 9, 2013, with a win over the Minnesota Timberwolves, the Warriors clinched the playoffs for the second time in 19 years and the first time since the 2006–07 "We Believe" Warriors. This time, the local battle cry was "We Belong". The team finished the season with a record of 47–35, earning the sixth seed in the Western Conference, and defeated the Denver Nuggets in the first round of the playoffs by winning four out of six games. They lost in the second round to the San Antonio Spurs, four games to two. This was the first playoff experience for all of the starters of this group except for Andrew Bogut. Other highlights of the season included Stephen Curry's 272 three-point baskets (an NBA single-season record for the player nicknamed "baby-faced assassin") and the naming of forward David Lee to the 2013 NBA All-Star Game as a reserve, ending the team's 16-year drought without an All Star selection. Curry and Klay Thompson, dubbed the "Splash Brothers" by team employee Brian Witt for their backcourt shooting prowess, combined for 483 three-pointers during the season, easily besting the prior record of 435 set by the Orlando Magic's Nick Anderson and Dennis Scott in 1995–96.

During the 2013 off-season, Golden State signed former Denver Nuggets swingman and future NBA Finals MVP Andre Iguodala to a four-year, $48 million deal. To make room under the salary cap, the Warriors traded Richard Jefferson, Andris Biedriņš and Brandon Rush (along with multiple draft picks) to the Utah Jazz. With their lone selection in the 2013 NBA draft, the Warriors made 22-year-old Serbian combo-guard Nemanja Nedovic the 30th and final pick of the first round. Other off-season changes included the departure of free agents Jarrett Jack and Carl Landry and the signings of forward-center Marreese Speights, center Jermaine O'Neal, point guard Toney Douglas, and Serbian center Ognjen Kuzmic.

The Warriors began the 2013–14 season showing flashes of brilliance and also plenty of lapses. In early December their record was 12–9, as compared to 17–4 the year before. One challenging factor was a tough starting schedule that saw them play 14 of their first 22 games on the road, including 10 games against teams holding playoff spots in the standings. A stream of injuries also held the team back, including injuries to Ezeli, Douglas, and O'Neal. Most prominently of all, Iguodala suffered a hamstring pull in late November that kept him out for over a month; during this period, the Warriors' performance suffered significantly on both the defensive and offensive ends of the court and the team posted a losing 5–7 record while revealing a lack of bench depth. With Iguodala back in the lineup, the Warriors went on a 10-game winning streak that included six consecutive wins on a single road trip, tying an NBA record. The winning streak was the longest for the franchise since the 1975 championship year, and fell just one win short of the team record of 11 consecutive wins.

To strengthen their underperforming bench, the Warriors made a three-team trade on January 15, sending Douglas to the Miami Heat and picking up guards Jordan Crawford and MarShon Brooks from the Boston Celtics. A day before the trade deadline, the Warriors traded Kent Bazemore and Brooks to the Los Angeles Lakers in exchange for veteran point guard Steve Blake. Boosted by the additions of Blake and Crawford and the play of 35-year-old Jermaine O'Neal (who returned sooner than expected from wrist surgery), the Warriors were one of the winningest teams in the NBA after the All-Star break. On April 11, in a 112–95 stomping of the Los Angeles Lakers at the Staples Center, the Warriors clinched a playoff berth in consecutive seasons for the first time since 1991 and 1992. However, just one day earlier in a loss against the Portland Trail Blazers, Andrew Bogut suffered a cracked rib kept him out of the postseason; the injury dealt a blow to the sixth-seed Warriors' playoff hopes.

Even as the team rolled towards the postseason, signs emerged of trouble in the Warriors' front office. On March 25, the team reassigned assistant coach Brian Scalabrine to the team's NBA Development League Affiliate in Santa Cruz because of what head coach Mark Jackson called a "difference in philosophies" and what unnamed league sources cited by Yahoo! Sports called "an increasingly dysfunctional atmosphere" on the Warriors' coaching staff. Less than two weeks later, assistant coach Darren Erman was fired for secretly recording conversations between coaches, staff and players.

The Warriors ended the season with a record of 51–31. The team won more than 50 games for only the fourth time in franchise history, finished 20 games over .500 for the first time in 22 years, and tied the 1991–92 squad for the franchise's all-time mark of 24 wins on the road. Even without Bogut, the Warriors battled the third-seed Los Angeles Clippers to a seventh and deciding game in the first round of the playoffs before their 2013–14 season came to an end. It was a season of many thrilling moments; the Warriors played in 17 regular-season games decided by two points or less, six games decided by winning shots in the final three seconds, and seven comeback wins in which the Warriors had been behind by 15 points or more. Curry also made his first appearance in the All-Star Game in 2014. Curry and Klay Thompson continued to set league records in three-point shooting. Curry, who finished the season with 261 threes, set an individual record for most three-pointers in a span of two seasons with 533, surpassing the previous mark of 478 set by former Seattle SuperSonics legend Ray Allen in 2004–05 and 2005–06. Together, Thompson and Curry combined for 484 threes on the year, besting by one the NBA record they had set the year before.

2014–2019: The dynasty
Jackson was fired as coach on May 6, 2014, despite a unanimous declaration of support from his players and a three-year 121–109 (.526) record that marked a major turnaround and placed him fourth on the franchise's all-time wins list, trailing Alvin Attles (557), Don Nelson (422) and Eddie Gottlieb (263). Over the 17 years before Jackson took the helm in 2011, the franchise had averaged 30.2 wins per season and made the playoffs only once. Jackson became just the third Warriors head coach to notch at least 50 wins in a season, joining Nelson and Attles, who both hit the mark twice.

On May 14, 2014, the Golden State Warriors signed Steve Kerr to a reported five-year, $25 million deal to become the team's new head coach. It was the first head-coach job for Kerr, 48, a five-time NBA champion guard who set an all-time career record for accuracy in three-point shooting (.454). Kerr had served as president and general manager for the Phoenix Suns basketball team from 2007 to 2010, and had recently been working as an NBA broadcast analyst for Turner Network Television (TNT). The Warriors also signed point guard Shaun Livingston and guard Leandro Barbosa during the off-season.

The Warriors completed the 2014–2015 regular season with a league-best record of 67–15, setting a Warriors record for wins. The team finished with a home record of 39–2, second-best in NBA history. The team ranked first in defensive efficiency for the season and second in offensive efficiency, barely missing the mark that the Julius Erving-led Sixers achieved by being first in both offensive and defensive efficiency. On May 4, Stephen Curry was named the 2014–15 NBA Most Valuable Player, the first Warrior since Wilt Chamberlain in 1960.

The Warriors swept the New Orleans Pelicans in the first round of the playoffs, defeated Memphis Grizzlies in six games in the second round, and dispatched Houston Rockets in five games in the Western Conference Finals. The Warriors advanced to their first NBA Finals since 1975. The team's opponent was the Cleveland Cavaliers, who would later go on to face the Warriors in each of the next three consecutive NBA Finals. After Golden State fell behind 2–1 in the series, Kerr gave swingman Andre Iguodala his first start of the season, replacing center Andrew Bogut in Game 4. The Warriors' small lineup (which came to be known as the Death Lineup) helped turn the series around. The Warriors defeated the Cavaliers in six games, and Iguodala was named Finals MVP. Kerr became the first rookie coach to win a title since Pat Riley in 1981–82.

Other highlights of the 2014–15 season included Stephen Curry breaking his own record for three-pointers made in a single season with 286. He and Klay Thompson made a combined 525 three-pointers, the most by a duo in NBA history. In the postseason, Curry shattered Reggie Miller's record of 58 made three-pointers in a single postseason with 98. On January 23, 2015, Klay Thompson broke an NBA record for points in a quarter with 37 in the third. Curry was also the leader in the voting polls for the 2015 NBA All-Star Game, won the 2014–15 NBA Most Valuable Player award and the 2015 ESPYs Best Male Athlete award.

On July 27, 2015, David Lee—who had lost his starting power forward job to Draymond Green during the season—was traded to the Boston Celtics in exchange for Gerald Wallace and Chris Babb; Golden State was seeking to offload his salary given his limited role on the team.

The Warriors began the 2015–2016 regular season by winning their first 24 games, the best start in NBA history. This surpassed the previous record of 15–0 by the 1948–49 Capitols and the 1993–94 Rockets, and broke a 131-year-old record of 20–0 set by the 1884 St. Louis Maroons baseball team, to claim the best start to a season in all of the major professional sports in America. These 24 wins included the best road start in NBA history at 14–0, surpassing the 1969–70 New York Knicks, which was also the joint-third longest road win streak. Their record-setting start ended when they were defeated by the Milwaukee Bucks on December 12, 2015. Golden State also won 28 consecutive regular-season games dating back to the 2014–15 season, eclipsing the 2012–13 Miami Heat for the second longest winning streak in NBA history. The team set an NBA record with 54 consecutive regular-season home wins, which spanned from January 31, 2015 to March 29, 2016; the previous record of 44 was held by the 1995–96 Chicago Bulls team led by Michael Jordan.

On March 31, 2016, the Warriors won their 68th win of the season in an overtime game over the Utah Jazz, breaking the franchise record for most wins in a single season in franchise history. On April 13, 2016, Golden State set the NBA record for most wins in a single season. The team finished the season with a record of 73–9. On May 10, 2016, Stephen Curry was named the NBA's Most Valuable Player (MVP) for the second straight season. Curry is the 11th player to win back-to-back MVP honors and became the first player in NBA history to win the MVP award by unanimous vote, winning all 131 first-place votes. Stephen Curry, Draymond Green and Klay Thompson were all named to the 2016 All-Star Game. Green broke the Golden State franchise record of nine triple-doubles in a season. Curry broke numerous three-point records during the season, including his own NBA record for made three-pointers in a season of 286; he finished the season with 402 three-pointers. He made a three-pointer in 151 consecutive games, which broke the NBA record of 127 set by Kyle Korver in 2014. On February 27, 2016, Curry also tied the NBA record of twelve three-pointers made in a single game, jointly holding it with Donyell Marshall and Kobe Bryant.

The Warriors reached the NBA Finals for the second consecutive year, facing a rematch against the Cleveland Cavaliers. The Warriors won three of the first four games of the 2016 NBA Finals, but the Cavaliers made a comeback to tie the series at three wins apiece. Draymond Green was suspended for Game Five of the series, and Curry was ejected from Game Six. In Game Seven, the Warriors lost the series on their home court, earning the distinction of becoming the first team to lose the NBA Finals after having led three games to one.

July 2016 featured a series of significant player transactions. On July 4, 2016, Kevin Durant announced he was leaving the Oklahoma City Thunder to sign a two-year contract with the Golden State Warriors. On July 7, Durant signed his contract, which gave the Warriors a fourth All-NBA player on their team. The Durant signing made the Warriors prohibitive favorites to win the 2017 NBA championship, according to oddsmakers. On July 9, 2016, free-agent forward Harrison Barnes signed with the Dallas Mavericks. Centers Festus Ezeli and Marreese Speights left the Warriors for other teams, as did guard Leandro Barbosa. Center Andrew Bogut was traded, along with a future second-round pick, to the Dallas Mavericks in exchange for a future conditional second-round pick. Veteran power forward David West signed with the Warriors, as did free-agent center Zaza Pachulia.

The Warriors posted many notable achievements during the 2016–17 regular season. On November 7, 2016, Stephen Curry set the NBA record for most 3-pointers in a game with 13, in a 116–106 win over the Pelicans. On December 5, 2016, Klay Thompson scored 60 points in 29 minutes, in a 142–106 victory over the Pacers. In doing so, Thompson became the first player in NBA history to score 60 or more points in fewer than 30 minutes of playing time. Stephen Curry, Kevin Durant, Draymond Green, and Klay Thompson were all named to the 2017 NBA All-Star Game, making the Warriors only the eighth team in NBA history to have four All-Stars. On February 10, 2017, Draymond Green recorded a triple-double with 12 rebounds, 10 assists, and 10 steals, becoming the first player in NBA history to post a triple-double with fewer than 10 points. On March 2, 2017, the Warriors' streak for most games without back-to-back losses ended at 146 with a 94–87 loss to the Chicago Bulls. The streak eclipsed the previous record of 95 held by the Utah Jazz.

They were the first team in NBA playoff history to start the playoffs 12–0, defeating the Trail Blazers, the Jazz, and the Spurs in consecutive series. The 2017 Finals once again pitted the Warriors against the Cavaliers, becoming the first time in NBA history that two teams met in the Finals for three consecutive years. The Warriors won the championship after going 4–1 in the Finals, and their 16–1 playoff record garnered the best winning percentage in NBA playoffs history. After the Warriors announced that they were uncertain if they would make the customary visit to the White House by playoff champions, President Donald Trump rescinded his invitation. The team still planned to travel to Washington, D.C. to "celebrate equality, diversity and inclusion." Planned activities included meeting with local youth and a visit to the National Museum of African-American History and Culture.

After defeating both the Spurs and the Pelicans 4–1, the Warriors came up against the top-seeded Houston Rockets in the Western Conference Finals. Despite reaching a 3–2 disadvantage against the Rockets after Game 5, the Warriors staved off elimination and came back to win the series 4–3, winning the Western Conference for the 4th straight year. The 2018 Finals pitted the Warriors against the Cavaliers for the fourth consecutive season; this marked the first time in NBA history that the same two teams had met in the Finals for four consecutive years. The Warriors swept the Cavaliers to win their second straight NBA championship; previously, there had not been an NBA Finals sweep since 2007. On August 30, 2018, David West announced his retirement from the NBA after 15 seasons. Following the 2018 NBA Finals, writers for Sports Illustrated, USA Today, The Wall Street Journal, and the New York Daily News described the Warriors as a dynasty. The Warriors returned to the Finals the following year and lost 4–2 to the Toronto Raptors.

2019–2021: Return to San Francisco and struggles with injuries

In April 2014, the Warriors began the purchase process for a 12-acre (4.9 ha) site in Mission Bay, San Francisco, to hold a new 18,000-seat arena, which was expected to be ready beginning with the 2019–20 NBA season. The location was selected after an original proposal to construct the arena on Piers 30 and 32, just south of the Bay Bridge, met with vocal opposition due to concerns about traffic, environmental impacts and obstruction of views. The new location, which still faced some vocal opposition in San Francisco, eliminated the need for voter approval as required with the original site. The move also elicited criticism due to the perceived alienation of a loyal fanbase in Oakland. The sale was finalized in October 2015 and naming rights were sold to JPMorgan Chase for the arena to be called the Chase Center. Although the Warriors considered a name change, possibly returning to their former name of San Francisco Warriors, it was ultimately decided that they would remain the Golden State Warriors upon their return to San Francisco.

After the Finals loss to Toronto, during which Durant tore his Achilles and Thompson tore his ACL, Durant chose to sign a four-year deal with the Brooklyn Nets. In order to not lose Durant for nothing, the Warriors sent Durant along with a protected first-round pick (2020) to the Nets in exchange for D'Angelo Russell in a two-way sign-and-trade. The sign-and-trade triggered a hard cap for the Warriors, who were forced to trade Iguodala's $17 million salary to the Memphis Grizzlies while also giving them a top-4 protected 2024 first-round pick as incentive.

The Warriors played their first regular-season game at the Chase Center on October 24, 2019, in a 141–122 loss to the Los Angeles Clippers. During their very next home game, on October 30 against the Phoenix Suns, Curry broke his hand in a collision, requiring surgery that was expected to keep him out of action for at least 3 months. This, along with Thompson's injury rehab keeping him out the entire year, sent the Warriors into a downward spiral from which they never recovered. However, they saw second-round pick Eric Paschall, two-way player Damion Lee, and training camp pickup Marquese Chriss establish themselves as rotation players. At the trade deadline, the Warriors traded Russell, 2018 first-round pick Jacob Evans, and recent acquisition Omari Spellman to the Minnesota Timberwolves in exchange for Andrew Wiggins, a top-3 protected first-round pick, and a second-round pick. Curry returned for one game on March 5 before the season was suspended due to the COVID-19 pandemic. The Warriors were not one of the 22 teams invited to the NBA Bubble on June 4, which ended their 2019–20 season with a league-worst record of 15–50.

In the 2020 NBA draft lottery, the Warriors landed the second overall pick in the draft, which they used to draft James Wiseman. They also drafted Nico Mannion with the 48th overall pick. Just as the 2020–21 NBA season was about to begin, guard Klay Thompson was reported to miss the incoming season due to an Achilles tendon injury making the second season he missed in his career. At the beginning of the season against the Nets, Curry dropped 20 points to a 99–125 loss to the Nets. They finished the regular season with a 39–33 record, qualifying for the new NBA Play-in-Tournament against the seventh seeded Los Angeles Lakers. Curry won his second scoring title with 32.0 points per game and was in the NBA Most Valuable Player conversation alongside Philadelphia's Joel Embiid and Nuggets' Nikola Jokić, who would go on to win the award. The Warriors were eliminated from the playoffs after losing two play-in tournaments to the Los Angeles Lakers who would become the seventh seed, and the Memphis Grizzlies, originally the ninth seed, who went on to face the Jazz after winning the play-in against the Warriors. This was the second consecutive year that the Warriors missed the playoffs.

2021–present: Back to the championship
With the 2021 NBA draft lottery, the Warriors landed the seventh pick in the draft from the Minnesota Timberwolves from the D'Angelo Russell trade, and their own 14th overall pick. With the seventh overall pick, the Warriors selected the NBA G League Ignite's forward Jonathan Kuminga and with the 14th overall pick, the Warriors selected Arkansas guard Moses Moody. The Warriors re-signed Curry to a four-year extension deal worth up to $215 million. They also acquired Magic forward Otto Porter Jr. and Heat forward Nemanja Bjelica to one-year deals. On August 10, 2021, Andre Iguodala signed a deal to come back to the Bay Area.

In January 2022, the team faced controversy after part-owner Chamath Palihapitiya repeatedly stated on a podcast that he did not care about the ongoing genocide of Uyghurs in China. The team distanced themselves from Palihapitiya stating that he "does not speak on behalf of our franchise, and his views certainly don't reflect those of our organization." The Warriors' statement was criticized for not mentioning the Uyghurs or the Uyghur genocide.

On April 10, 2022, the Warriors clinched the third seed in the Western conference, qualifying for the playoffs for the first time since the 2018–19 season. In the first round, they advanced past the Denver Nuggets, and triumphed over the Memphis Grizzlies in the conference semi-finals. On May 26, 2022, the Warriors advanced to their seventh NBA Finals after defeating the Dallas Mavericks in the Western Conference Finals, 4–1. On June 16, 2022, the team won their seventh NBA title, beating the Boston Celtics 4–2. Curry, Thompson, Green, and Iguodala all won their fourth championship as members of the Warriors.

In 2021, the Golden State Warriors, among other high-profile athletes and celebrities, were a paid spokespersons for FTX, a cryptocurrency exchange. In November 2022, FTX filed for bankruptcy, wiping out billions of dollars in customer funds. The Warriors, alongside other spokespeople, are currently being sued for promoting unregistered securities through a class-action lawsuit. In February 2022, the U.S. 11th Circuit Court of Appeals ruled in a lawsuit against Bitconnect that the Securities Act of 1933 extends to targeted solicitation using social media.

Logos and uniforms
The Warriors have utilized several different logo and uniform designs throughout their history, with the most recent redesign occurring in 2010. However, on June 12, 2019, the Warriors unveiled subtle adjustments to their primary logo, including a new custom font. The club then unveiled six new uniform designs using the newly updated logo on September 17, 2019.

For the 2020–21 season, the Warriors wore a "City" uniform that paid tribute to the "We Believe" era in Oakland, as well as their 47 seasons there in general. It features the same coloring scheme as well as the "Oakland" location identifier in the lettering of the previous logo.

For the 2021–22 season, the Warriors wore a Warriors Origins jersey, which is a modernization of their 1961–62 road uniform. The 1961–62 season was their last season in Philadelphia, as well as the season in which Wilt Chamberlain scored 100 points in a single game. The jersey also commemorates the 75th anniversary of the franchise.

Rivalries

Cleveland Cavaliers

While the Warriors and the Cleveland Cavaliers have played each other since the Cavaliers joined the NBA in 1970, the two teams' rivalry began to develop in the 2014–15 season when they met in the first of four consecutive NBA Finals. Previously, no pair of teams had faced each other in more than two consecutive Finals. The Warriors have won three of the four NBA Finals in which they faced the Cavaliers, losing in 2016, and winning in 2015, 2017, and 2018.

Media

Television
Bob Fitzgerald has done television play-by-play, and former Warriors swingman Kelenna Azubuike does color commentary for the Warriors on NBC Sports Bay Area, where they telecast more than 70 Warrior games a year. They also host Roundtable Live, a half-hour pre-game show leading up to the broadcast of select Golden State home games, and also do postgame analysis. Fitzgerald is in his 24th season as the Warriors' play-by-play man, as for Azubuike his 2nd as the color analyst.

Former Warrior guard Jim Barnett was the TV color analyst from 1985 to 2019, and is now the full-time color man on the radio.

Greg Papa and Garry St. Jean are also members of the telecast team, specializing in pregame, in-game, halftime and post-game analysis, while Kerith Burke serves as the sideline reporter.

Radio

Tim Roye has done the radio play-by-play for Warrior games since 1995. He is joined in the booth by former Warriors forward Tom Tolbert for home games only. He will also be joined by Jim Barnett full-time starting in 2019, who will do color analysis for both road and home games, and has already been at the booth for nationally televised and postseason matchups.

On August 25, 2016, the Warriors announced they were leaving long time station KNBR and all of their games will be broadcast on KGMZ's 95.7 The Game. After each game, Roye, Fitzgerald and Barnett get together for post-game radio analysis and a next-game preview.

Season-by-season record
List of the last five seasons completed by the Warriors. For the full season-by-season history, see List of Golden State Warriors seasons.

Note: GP = Games played, W = Wins, L = Losses, W–L% = Winning percentage

Home arenas
Philadelphia Arena (1946–1962)
Philadelphia Convention Hall (1952–1962)
Cow Palace (1962–1964, 1966–1971, and two games in 1975 NBA Finals)
War Memorial Gymnasium (occasional games, 1962–1967)
San Francisco Civic Auditorium (1964–1966)
Oakland Coliseum Arena/The Arena in Oakland/Oracle Arena (1971–2019)
San Diego Sports Arena (six games in 1971–1972)
San Jose Arena (1996–1997 due to renovations at Oakland Arena)
Chase Center (2019–present)

Head coaches

Players

Current roster

Retained draft rights
The Warriors hold the draft rights to the following unsigned draft picks who have been playing outside the NBA. A drafted player, either an international draftee or a college draftee, who is not signed by the team that drafted him, is allowed to sign with any non-NBA teams. In this case, the team retains the player's draft rights in the NBA until one year after the player's contract with the non-NBA team ends. This list includes draft rights that were acquired from trades with other teams.

Retired numbers

Notes:
 1 Includes Chamberlain's tenure (1959–1962) in Philadelphia; retired posthumously.
 2 Includes Meschery's tenure (1961–1962) in Philadelphia.
 3 Includes Attles' tenure (1960–1962) in Philadelphia. He also served as head coach (1969–1983).
 4 Also served as general manager (2004–2009).
 Meschery, Attles, Barry, Thurmond and Mullin are also members of the Bay Area Sports Hall of Fame.
 In July 2019, the team announced its intentions to retire No. 35 for Kevin Durant and No. 9 for Andre Iguodala when both of them retire.
 The NBA retired Bill Russell's No. 6 for all its member teams on August 11, 2022.

Naismith Memorial Basketball Hall of Fame members

Notes:
 1 In total, Mullin was inducted into the Hall of Fame twice – as player and as a member of the 1992 Olympic team.
 2 In total, Lucas was inducted into the Hall of Fame twice – as player and as a member of the 1960 Olympic team.
 3 In total, Newell was inducted into the Hall of Fame twice – as contributor and as a member of the 1960 Olympic team.

Arizin, Fulks, Gola, Johnston and Phillip played all or most of their tenure with the Warriors in Philadelphia. Rodgers' tenure was evenly divided between Philadelphia and San Francisco, and Chamberlain's and Attles' nearly so. King (Knicks), Lucas (Knicks), Parish (Celtics), Richmond (Kings), Sampson (University of Virginia and Rockets), White (Celtics), and Wilkes (Lakers) were elected mostly for their performances with other teams. Marčiulionis played most of his NBA career with Golden State, but his induction is also for his distinguished international career (Statyba, USSR, and Lithuania). Of those elected to the hall primarily as Warriors, only Thurmond, Barry and Mullin spent significant time with the team since the 1971 move to Oakland and the name change to "Golden State".

FIBA Hall of Famers

Statistical leaders and awards

Franchise Leaders

Individual awards

Most Valuable Player
Wilt Chamberlain – 1960
Stephen Curry – 2015, 2016

NBA Western Conference Finals MVP
Stephen Curry – 2022

NBA Finals MVP
Rick Barry – 1975
Andre Iguodala – 2015
Kevin Durant – 2017, 2018
Stephen Curry – 2022

NBA Defensive Player of the Year
Draymond Green – 2017

NBA Rookie of the Year
Woody Sauldsberry – 1958
Wilt Chamberlain – 1960
Rick Barry – 1966
Jamaal Wilkes – 1975
Mitch Richmond – 1989
Chris Webber – 1994

NBA Most Improved Player of the Year
Gilbert Arenas – 2003
Monta Ellis – 2007

NBA Executive of the Year
Dick Vertlieb – 1975
Bob Myers - 2015, 2017

NBA Coach of the Year
Alex Hannum – 1964
Don Nelson – 1992
Steve Kerr – 2016

NBA Sportsmanship Award
Stephen Curry – 2011

NBA Community Assist Award
Stephen Curry – 2014

All-NBA First Team
Joe Fulks – 1947–1949
Howie Dallmar – 1948
Paul Arizin – 1952, 1956, 1957
Neil Johnston – 1953–1956
Wilt Chamberlain – 1960–1962, 1964
Rick Barry – 1966, 1967, 1974–1976
Chris Mullin – 1992
Latrell Sprewell – 1994
Stephen Curry – 2015, 2016, 2019, 2021
Kevin Durant – 2018

All-NBA Second Team
Joe Fulks – 1951
Andy Phillip – 1952, 1953
Jack George – 1956
Neil Johnston – 1957
Tom Gola – 1958
Paul Arizin – 1959
Wilt Chamberlain – 1963
Rick Barry – 1973
Phil Smith – 1976
Bernard King – 1982
Chris Mullin – 1989, 1991
Tim Hardaway – 1992
Stephen Curry – 2014, 2017, 2022
Draymond Green – 2016
Kevin Durant – 2017, 2019

All-NBA Third Team
Chris Mullin – 1990
Tim Hardaway – 1993
David Lee – 2013
Klay Thompson – 2015, 2016
Draymond Green – 2017
Stephen Curry – 2018

NBA All-Defensive First Team
Nate Thurmond – 1969, 1971
Andre Iguodala – 2014
Draymond Green – 2015–2017, 2021

NBA All-Defensive Second Team
Rudy LaRusso – 1969
Nate Thurmond – 1972–1974
Phil Smith – 1976
Jamaal Wilkes – 1976, 1977
E.C. Coleman – 1978
Latrell Sprewell – 1994
Andrew Bogut – 2015
Draymond Green – 2018, 2019, 2022
Klay Thompson – 2019

NBA All-Rookie First Team
Nate Thurmond – 1964
Fred Hetzel – 1966
Rick Barry – 1966
Jamaal Wilkes – 1975
Gus Williams – 1976
Joe Barry Carroll – 1981
Larry Smith – 1981
Mitch Richmond – 1989
Tim Hardaway – 1990
Billy Owens – 1992
Chris Webber – 1994
Joe Smith – 1996
Marc Jackson – 2001
Jason Richardson – 2002
Stephen Curry – 2010
Klay Thompson – 2012
Harrison Barnes – 2013
Eric Paschall – 2020

NBA All-Rookie Second Team
Latrell Sprewell – 1993
Donyell Marshall – 1995
Antawn Jamison – 1999

NBA All-Star Weekend

NBA All-Star selections
Paul Arizin – 1951, 1952, 1955–1962
Joe Fulks – 1951, 1952
Andy Phillip – 1951, 1952
Neil Johnston – 1953–1958
Jack George - 1956, 1957
Woody Sauldsberry – 1959
Tom Gola – 1960–1962
Wilt Chamberlain – 1960–1965
Tom Meschery – 1963
Guy Rodgers – 1963, 1964, 1966
Nate Thurmond – 1965–1968, 1970, 1973, 1974
Rick Barry – 1966, 1967, 1973–1978
Jim King – 1968
Clyde Lee – 1968
Rudy LaRusso – 1968, 1969
Jeff Mullins – 1969–1971
Jerry Lucas – 1971 
Cazzie Russell – 1972
Jamaal Wilkes – 1976
Phil Smith – 1976, 1977
Bernard King – 1982
Sleepy Floyd – 1987
Joe Barry Carroll – 1987
Chris Mullin – 1989–1993
Tim Hardaway – 1991–1993
Latrell Sprewell – 1994, 1995, 1997
David Lee – 2013
Stephen Curry – 2014–2019, 2021–2023
Klay Thompson – 2015–2019
Draymond Green – 2016–2018, 2022
Kevin Durant – 2017–2019
Andrew Wiggins – 2022

NBA All-Star Game head coach
 Alex Hannum – 1965
 Bill Sharman – 1968
 Al Attles – 1975, 1976
 Don Nelson – 1992
 Steve Kerr – 2015, 2017

NBA All-Star Game MVP
Paul Arizin – 1952
Wilt Chamberlain – 1960
Rick Barry – 1967
Kevin Durant – 2019
Stephen Curry – 2022

Slam Dunk Contest
Jason Richardson – 2002, 2003

Three-Point Contest
Stephen Curry – 2015, 2021
Klay Thompson – 2016

Notes

References

External links

 

 
National Basketball Association teams
Basketball teams established in 1946
1946 establishments in Pennsylvania
Relocated National Basketball Association teams
Basketball teams in the San Francisco Bay Area